Rosslynlee Hospital Halt railway station that served Rosslynlee Hospital, Midlothian, Scotland from 1958 to 1962 on the Peebles Railway.

History 
The station opened on 11 December 1958 by British Railways. The station was situated in the north west corner of Rosslynlee Hospital grounds. This was one of several attempts in Scotland to served line-side institutions with new diesel trains; most of them were very short lived. The halt was only open for 3 years and was cheaply constructed. The halt was made possible by a collaboration between the Scottish Region of British Railways and the Board of Management of the Royal Edinburgh Hospital. The hospital staff were responsible for the lighting, the house steward sold tickets from the office and the station master of  visited twice a week to collect money from ticket sales. There was one siding which took deliveries of coal from the internal gasworks. The station was closed to passengers on 5 February 1962.

References

External links 

Disused railway stations in Midlothian
Railway stations opened by British Rail
Railway stations in Great Britain opened in 1958
Railway stations in Great Britain closed in 1962
1958 establishments in Scotland
1962 disestablishments in Scotland